The 2002 Open Romania was a men's tennis tournament played on outdoor clay courts at the Arenele BNR in Bucharest in Romania and was part of the International Series of the 2002 ATP Tour. It was the 10th edition of the tournament and was held from 9 September through 15 September 2002.

Unseeded David Ferrer won the singles title.

Finals

Singles

 David Ferrer defeated  José Acasuso 6–3, 6–2
 It was Ferrer's only title of the year and the 1st of his career.

Doubles

 Jens Knippschild /  Peter Nyborg defeated  Emilio Benfele Álvarez /  Andrés Schneiter 6–3, 6–3
 It was Knippschild's only title of the year and the 2nd of his career. It was Nyborg's only title of the year and the 5th of his career.

References

External links
 Official website 
 ATP tournament profile

Open Romania
Romanian Open
Open
Open Romania